Nanda Rea is a scientific researcher in the field of astrophysics, currently based in Barcelona, Spain working as a staff scientist for the Consejo Superior de Investigaciones Científicas and Institut d'Estudis Espacials de Catalunya.

Education and career 
Nanda Rea was born in Rome from an iItalo-Argentinian father and an Iranian mother. She studied Physics at the University of Rome Tor Vergata, and specialised in Astrophysics at the end of her Master studies. In 2004, while pursuing her PhD at the National Italian Institute for Astrophysics (INAF), she moved to The Netherlands with an EU Marie Curie fellowship, aimed at training young students to mobility within Europe. She joined the Netherlands Institute for Space Research (SRON) where she graduated and then continued working until 2007. Thanks to an NWO VENI Fellowship she worked at the University of Amsterdam until 2009, when moved to Spain with a Ramón y Cajal Fellowship. Between 2012 and 2016 she moved back to The Netherlands as a Research Group Leader at the University of Amsterdam with a VIDI NWO Award. Since 2016 she is a staff scientist at the Consejo Superior de Investigaciones Científicas (CSIC), where she has a large group founded by an H2020 European Research Council Consolidator Grant.

Awards and recognition 
Knight of the Order of the Star of Italy (2021)  
Award for Science and Engineer from Banco Sabadell Foundation (2020)  
Award from the Spanish Royal Academy of Sciences for female scientists in Physics and Chemistry (2019)  
National Catalan Award for Young Scientific Researchers (2017)  
International Union of Pure and Applied Physics Young Scientist Prize for Astrophysics (2014)  
Zeldovich Medal from COSPAR and Russian Academy of Science (2014)

Selected publications 
 "A very young radio-loud magnetar" – Esposito P., Rea N., Borghese A., et al. 2020, ApJ Letters 896, L30 (NASA Press Release, ESA Press Release)
 "The X-Ray outburst of the Galactic center magnetar over six years of Chandra observations" – Rea N., Coti Zelati F., Vigano D., et al. 2020, ApJ 894, 159
 "Fifty years of pulsar astrophysics" –  Rea N., 2017, Nature Astronomy (CSIC Press Release)
 "Magnetar-like activity from the Central Compact Object in the SNR RCW103" – Rea N., Borghese A., Esposito P., et al. 2016, ApJ Letters 828, L13 (NASA Press Release)
 "Neutron stars hidden nuclear pasta" – Rea N. 2015, Physics Today 68, 62
 "A highly resistive layer within the crust of X-ray pulsars limits their spin periods" – Pons J. A., Vigano D. & Rea N., 2013, Nature Physics 9, 431 (CSIC Press Release)
 "A strongly magnetized pulsar within the grasp of the Milky Way's supermassive black hole" – Rea N., Esposito P., Pons J. A., et al. 2013, ApJ Letters 775, L34 (NASA Press Releases)
 "The fundamental plane for radio magnetars – Rea N., Pons J. A., Torres D. F. & Turolla R. 2021, ApJ Letters 748, L12
 "A low-magnetic field Soft Gamma Repeater" – Rea N., Esposito P., Turolla R. et al. 2010, Science 330, 944 (ESA Press Release, NASA Press Releases) 
 "Resonant cyclotron scattering in magnetars' emission – Rea N., Zane S., Turolla R., Lyutikov M. & Gotz D. 2008, ApJ 686, 1245 (ESA Press Release)

Memberships 
 European Space Agency Athena Science Study Team (2020–present)
 European Space Agency Astronomy Working Group (2018–2020)
 Square Kilometre Array (SKA) Transient and Pulsars working groups (2018–present)
 ESF−COST PHAROS Action Chair (2017–present)
 European Space Agency XMM-Newton User Group (2015–2019)
 NASA Fermi-LAT collaboration affiliated scientist (2008–present)
 Gran Telescopio Canarias (GTC) Users Committee (2012–2014)

External links

Interviews, public outreach 
 RTVE Interview − (16/12/2020): 
 Catalan Television TV3 Interview − Més324 (20/10/2020): 
 Radio Nacional de España 4 − De boca a Orella (29/03/2019) - 
 Radio Nacional de España Clasica − Longitud de Onda (01/11/2018): 
 National Spanish Television − Lab 24 (28/05/2018): 
 Catalan Television TV3 Interview − Més324 (18/05/2018):

References 

Living people
Women astrophysicists
21st-century Italian astronomers
Year of birth missing (living people)
Italian astrophysicists
Italian women scientists
University of Rome Tor Vergata alumni
Scientists from Rome